Anna Bondár and Tereza Mihalíková were the defending champions, but both players chose not to participate.

Sofya Lansere and Rebecca Šramková won the title, defeating Lee Pei-chi and Wu Fang-hsien in the final, 4–6, 6–2, [11–9].

Seeds

Draw

Draw

References

External Links
Main Draw

Empire Women's Indoor 2 - Doubles